The large butterfly family Lycaenidae contains the following genera:

A B C D E F G H I J K L M N O P Q R S T U V W X Y Z

Virachola

References 

Genera in the family Lycaenidae starting with V at LepIndex

Lycaenidae V
V*